The Outlook is a newspaper published in Gresham, Oregon, a suburb of Portland in the U.S. state of Oregon. It was founded in 1911, and is currently owned by the Pamplin Media Group.

It was named the Gresham Outlook from 1911 to 1991 and was published by H. L. St. Clair, who incorporated the business as the Outlook Publishing Company in 1917.  The paper was renamed simply The Outlook in 1991.

The paper was purchased in 1960 by Lee Irwin and Walt Taylor, and Irwin was its publisher from 1960 to 1982. He was followed by Robert Caldwell for a relatively short period, with Steven J. Clark being named publisher effective April 4, 1983.  Robert B. Pamplin, Jr.  purchased the paper in 2000.

References

External links 

Gresham, Oregon
1911 establishments in Oregon
Newspapers published by Pamplin Media Group
Oregon Newspaper Publishers Association
Newspapers established in 1911